Follo (locally ) is a comune (municipality) in the Province of La Spezia in the Italian region Liguria, located about  southeast of Genoa and about  northeast of La Spezia, between the Val di Vara, the Gulf of La Spezia and the Val di Magra plain.

Follo borders the following municipalities: Beverino, Bolano, Calice al Cornoviglio, La Spezia, Podenzana, Riccò del Golfo di Spezia, Vezzano Ligure.

References

External links
 Official website

Cities and towns in Liguria